Lucien M'baïdem, better known as Lucien Revolucien, also Lucien M'B and Papalu, is a French hip-hop artist who was influential in the hip-hop movement in France in the 1990s.

Lucien Revolucien is featured on Afrika Bambaataa's 1989 release "Hip-Hop Against Apartheid"/"L'Unité Africaine". Lucien was also an MC for the late-night live hip-hop sessions with DJ Dee Nasty on Radio Nova from 1988 to 1993. He has been affiliated with the Native Tongues Posse (a group that includes A Tribe Called Quest, Jungle Brothers, De La Soul, Queen Latifah, Black Sheep) and to The Beatnuts (he is the only outside producer who made a song for The Beatnuts: "Ya Don't Stop" on their first album, The Beatnuts: Street Level).

A Tribe Called Quest included a song dedicated to Lucien ("Luck of Lucien") on their first LP, People's Instinctive Travels and the Paths of Rhythm. Common also featured a similar song on his album Electric Circus, "Heaven Somewhere".

Lucien moved back to France in 1995, where he works on the hip hop soundtrack of hit TV series Les Lascars.

Guest appearances and production work
 Jungle Brothers – "Belly Dancin' Dina" (~Oriental Break), "Black Woman"(Intro.) – on "Done By the Forces of Nature" 1989 (Background Vocals)
 Jimmy Jay -"?"(*) – on "Cool Sessions-Vol. 1"
 Alliance Ethnik – "Jamais à L'Heure" 1995 (feat. Psycho Les.)
 The Beatnuts – "Ya Don't Stop" – on "The Beatnuts: Street Level" 1994 (Prod.: Lucien)
 Suprême NTM – "Check The Flow" – on "Paris Sous Les Bombes" 1995
 Guru  / Various – "Lifesaver" – on "Jazzmatazz, Vol. II: The New Reality" 1995
 Afro Jazz – "Trois Spliffs & Un Freestyle" – on compilation "L432" 1995
 Afro Jazz – "Perle Noire " & " Paris-NewYork" (First EP) 1996 (Prod.: Papalu )
 Afro Jazz – "Guerre Des Nerfs" – in "Afrocalypse" 1997 (feat. Suprême NTM.)
 Afro Jazz  – "Tout de Go" – on "AJ-1 : Révélation" 1999 (feat. L Loco, Fdy Phenomen) (Prod.: Papalu )
 Ärsenik – "Lascars" – 1999 (feat. Lord Kossity)

See also
 Native Tongues Posse

References

 https://web.archive.org/web/20110605112008/http://www.nme.com/artists/lucien-revolucien

Living people
Year of birth missing (living people)
French rappers